Samir Kumar Mohanty is an Indian politician from the state of Jharkhand who is a Member of the Jharkhand Legislative Assembly, representing the Baharagora constituency. A member of the Jharkhand Mukti Morcha party, he was elected in the 2019 Jharkhand election by 60565 votes.

Education 
Samir did his primary schooling in his native village Bend, Chakulia and Matriculation from local Manoharlal Governmental High School and later graduated from Ghatshila College, Ghatshila.

Career 

Mohanty started his political career with the Jharkhand Mukti Morcha (JMM) party, contesting the 2014 elections on a JVM ticket from the Baharagora assembly seat in Jharkhand.  After the elections, he joined the BJP. In 2019, Mohanty rejoined the JMM, describing his return as a "homecoming" after "14 years of exile".

Constituency 
Baharagora is the trijunction of Odisha, West Bengal, and Jharkhand, and is one of the most literate blocks of Jharkhand. Baharagora is called the rice bowl of the state with maximum paddy production in Jharkhand. Baharagora has many tourist sites, such as Chitreshwar Siva temple and Pahari Mandir Ichrashole.

References 

Living people
1971 births